Hungry Hill or Knockday is the highest of the Caha Mountains on the Beara Peninsula in Munster, Ireland.

Etymology 
The first part of the Irish name Cnoc Daod means "hill". The second part may be a dialectal variant of déad, meaning "tooth", "set of teeth" or "jaw". It has been anglicized as Knockdhead and Knockday.

Geography 

With a height of  it is the highest peak of the Caha Mountains and the 130th highest in Ireland. Hungry Hill lies on the border of counties Cork and Kerry, although the peak is on the Cork side.

There is a cairn at the summit and a number of standing stones to the south and east of the mountain. At its eastern foot are two lakes — Coomadayallig and Coomarkane — which both drain into the Mare's Tail waterfall. This is the highest waterfall in Ireland and the UK.

In popular culture 

Hungry Hill is the title and setting of a 1943 novel by English author Daphne du Maurier. Her descriptions of the mountain and environs are markedly similar to the actual location. In the novel, the name of the mountain is metaphoric, as during the course of the novel the mountain seems to ‘swallow’ successive generations of the Broderick family, who own and mine the mountain. The story is reputedly based on the Irish ancestors of Daphne du Maurier’s friend Christopher Puxley.

See also
 List of mountains in Ireland

References 

Hewitts of Ireland
Marilyns of Ireland
Mountains and hills of County Cork
Beara peninsula
Mountains under 1000 metres